Luis Carlos Ruiz Morales (born 8 January 1987) is a Colombian professional footballer who plays as a striker for Categoría Primera A club Millonarios.

Career
Ruiz was the joint top goal scorer during the 2013 Torneo Finalización with Dayro Moreno, both scoring 16 goals.

In December 2013, Ruiz claimed he had signed a Four-year contract with Neftchi Baku in the Azerbaijani Premier League, though this claim was denied by Neftchi. On 4 January 2014, Ruiz announced that he wouldn't be joining Neftchi after all and that the statement posted had been the result of hackers hacking his Twitter account.

In February 2014, Ruiz joined Shanghai Greenland Shenhua in the Chinese Super League. The transfer fee was about €3 million, and he linked up with fellow Colombian Giovanni Moreno. In June 2014, Ruiz returned to Colombia, signing for Atlético Nacional.

Career statistics

Honours

Club

Atlético Nacional
Categoría Primera A (3): 2014–I, 2015–II, 2017–I
Superliga Colombiana (1): 2016
Recopa Sudamericana (1): 2017

Junior
Categoría Primera A (3): 2010–I, 2011–II, 2018–II
Superliga Colombiana (1): 2019

Notes

References

External links
 

1987 births
Living people
Colombian footballers
Barranquilla F.C. footballers
Atlético Junior footballers
Shanghai Shenhua F.C. players
Atlético Nacional footballers
Sport Club do Recife players
Categoría Primera A players
Categoría Primera B players
Chinese Super League players
Campeonato Brasileiro Série A players
Colombian expatriate footballers
Expatriate footballers in China
Expatriate footballers in Brazil
Colombian expatriate sportspeople in China
Association football forwards
People from Santa Marta
Sportspeople from Magdalena Department